The 1999 Pattaya Women's Open doubles was the tennis doubles event of the first edition of the most prestigious tournament in Thailand. Émilie Loit and Åsa Carlsson won the title, in what was both players' first WTA doubles title, over Evgenia Koulikovskaya and Patricia Wartusch.

Seeds

Draw

Qualifying

Seeds

Qualifiers
 ''' Janet Lee /  Wynne Prakusya

Qualifying draw

References
 ITF doubles results page

Doubles
Pattaya Women's Open - Doubles
 in women's tennis